Todamerica Records was a Brazilian record label, in business from about 1950 through the 1970s. The label specialized in Brazilian music and other music of Latin America. Artists who recorded for Todamerica include João Gilberto and Luiz Americano.

Todamerica Records was headquartered in São Paulo.

See also
 List of record labels

References

Brazilian record labels
Record labels established in 1950
Defunct record labels
Latin American music record labels